Milton Keynes City Council is the local authority for the City of Milton Keynes, a unitary authority in Buckinghamshire, England. Until 1 April 1997 it was a non-metropolitan district.

Political control
Since the first Milton Keynes Council elections in 1973 political control of the council has been held by the following parties:

Non-metropolitan district

Unitary authority

Leadership
The leaders of the council since 2000 have been:

Council elections

1.In 1976, 1996, 2002 and 2014, the whole council was elected after boundary changes.

In 1991 borough boundary changes took place but the number of seats remained the same.

By ward

2002 to 2012
The composition of Milton Keynes Council following each election was as follows.

2014 to present
In 2014 the boundaries were revised so that there were 57 seats and each ward had three seats each [see below]. Elections were held for all seats in that year, before returning to the one-third model for subsequent years.

Borough result maps

By-election results

Frequency
One third of the council is elected each year for 3 years, followed by one year without election, unless there is a substantial boundary change (when all seats are elected). Following an electoral review, changes to wards and an increase in the number of seats, 57 councillors were elected for all 19 wards from May 2014 onwards.  After the previous reorganisation in 2002, 51 councillors were elected from 23 wards.

Wards

1973
The first elections to the newly created Milton Keynes Borough Council took place on 7 June 1973
There were 40 seats up for election spread over 16 Wards. All councillors were elected for three years

1976
In November 1975, the Boundary Commission proposed new ward boundaries. (These wards are generally larger than the civil parishes that give them their names. Some parishes are divided between wards. For details, see the Boundary Commission report.)
 Bletchley Central 
 Danesborough
 Denbigh 
 Eaton 
 Loughton 
 Newport Rural
 Newport Urban
 Newton
 Petsoe Manor
 Pineham 
 Sherington 
 Stantonbury 
 Stony Stratford
 Watling 
 Whaddon 
 Wolverton

1996 to 2000
Between 1996 and 2000, there were 51 seats up for election. Boundary changes were made before the 2002 election but this did not affect the number of seats up for election.

2002 to 2012

From 2002 until the 2014 local elections, there were 23 wards in the Borough, which were represented by 51 councillors. The councillors corresponded to the wards in the following way:
 There were 8 wards that represented by 3 councillors:
 Bletchley & Fenny Stratford
 Bradwell
 Campbell Park
 Emerson Valley
 Loughton Park
 Stony Stratford
 Walton Park
 Wolverton
 There were 12 wards that represented by 2 councillors:
 Denbigh
 Eaton Manor
 Furzton
 Linford North
 Linford South
 Middleton
 Newport Pagnell North
 Newport Pagnell South
 Olney
 Stantonbury
 Whaddon  
 Woughton
 There were 3 wards that represented by 1 councillor:
 Danesborough
 Hanslope Park
 Sherington

2014 onwards

Following an electoral review and with effect from the 2014 Milton Keynes Council election in May 2014, there were 57 Councillors representing 19 wards, each with having 3 councillors.

These wards are as follows:
 Bletchley East
 Bletchley Park
 Bletchley West
 Bradwell
 Broughton
 Campbell Park & Old Woughton
 Central Milton Keynes
 Danesborough & Walton
 Loughton & Shenley
 Monkston
 Newport Pagnell North & Hanslope
 Newport Pagnell South
 Olney
 Shenley Brook End
 Stantonbury
 Stony Stratford
 Tattenhoe
 Wolverton
 Woughton & Fishermead

References

External links
Milton Keynes Council
By-election results

 
Politics of Milton Keynes
Council elections in Buckinghamshire
Unitary authority elections in England